Gediminas Castle is the name applied to:

 Gediminas Tower in Vilnius, Lithuania
 Lida Castle in Lida, Belarus